Paraonagylla is a genus of moths in the subfamily Arctiinae. It contains the single species Paraonagylla zavattarii, which is found in Ethiopia.

References

Natural History Museum Lepidoptera generic names catalog

Endemic fauna of Ethiopia
Lithosiini